Caladenia echidnachila, commonly known as the fawn spider orchid, is a plant in the orchid family Orchidaceae and is endemic to Tasmania. It is a ground orchid with a single, hairy leaf and one or two fawn-coloured flowers with thin red lines on the sepals and petals.

Description
Caladenia echidnachila is a terrestrial, perennial, deciduous, herb with an underground tuber and which grows singly or in loose groups. The leaf is dull green and has purple blotches near its base.

The petals and sepals have pale reddish lines along their length. The lateral sepals are similar in size and shape to the dorsal sepal but slightly wider, spreading stiffly and widely. There are short, blunt teeth on the sides of the labellum, decreasing in size towards the front and four to six rows of dark red calli along its centre.

Taxonomy and naming
Caladenia echidnachila was first formally described by William Nicholls in 1933 and the description was published in Papers and Proceedings of the Royal Society of Tasmania. The specific epithet (echidnachila) is derived from the Ancient Greek words Ἕχιδνα echidna meaning "adder" or "viper", and χεῖλος cheilos meaning "lip" referring to the long tip of the labellum.

There is disagreement as to whether this orchid is the same species as C. patersonii.

Distribution and habitat
Fawn spider orchid usually grows in coastal scrub and heath in southern areas of Tasmania. Summer fires appear to encourage flowering.

References

echidnachila
Plants described in 1933
Endemic orchids of Australia
Orchids of Tasmania